Michel Courtiols (born 27 April 1965 in Fumel) is a former French rugby union player. He played as a flanker.

He played for Cahors Rugby and for Bordeaux Bègles, from 1990/91 to 1996/97. He won one title of the French Championship, in 1990/91, and two Cups of France, in 1990/91 and 1994/95.

Courtiols had 4 caps for France, in 1991, scoring 1 try, 4 points in aggregate. He was called for the 1991 Rugby World Cup but never played.

References

External links

1965 births
Living people
French rugby union players
France international rugby union players
Rugby union flankers
CA Bordeaux-Bègles Gironde players
Sportspeople from Lot-et-Garonne